Michelangelo is a given name that is a combination of the Hebrew name Michael (he who resembles God) and the Greek name Angelo (messenger). The name itself is most commonly believed to be of Italian origin. The best known of that name is Michelangelo Buonarroti (1475–1564), the Tuscan sculptor, architect, painter, and poet.

People with the given name
 Michelangelo Anselmi  (c. 1492–c. 1554), Italian painter in Parma
 Michelangelo Antonioni (1912–2007), Italian film director and writer
 Michelangelo Buonarroti the Younger (1568-1646), Florentine poet and playwright, his grandnephew
 Michelangelo Carducci (fl. 1560s), Italian painter active in Umbria
 Michelagnolo Galilei (1575–1631), Italian lutanist and composer, younger brother of the astronomer
 Michelangelo Merisi da Caravaggio (1571–1610), Italian painter active in Rome, Naples, Malta and Sicily 
 Michaelangelo Meucci (1840–1890), Italian painter
 Michelangelo Minieri (born 1981), Italian footballer
 Michelangelo Signorile (born 1960), American writer and talkshow host

Fictional characters with the given name
 Michelangelo, Teenage Mutant Ninja Turtles character

See also
 Michael Angelo Batio (born 1956), rock guitarist from Chicago
 Michael Angelo Pergolesi, 18th century Italian decorative artist in London

References

Italian masculine given names